Zapadnaya Litsa may refer to:
Zapadnaya Litsa (naval base), a naval base for the Russian Northern Fleet
Zapadnaya Litsa (river), a river in Murmansk Oblast, Russia
Zapadnaya Litsa Bay, a bay on the Murmansk Coast of the Kola Peninsula
Zapadnaya Litsa (rural locality), a rural locality (a settlement) in Leningrad Oblast